Tatul may refer to:

Places
 Tatul (Татул), a village in Momchilgrad municipality, Kardzhali Province, in the Eastern Rhodopes, in southern Bulgaria.
 Tatul Island, a triangular ice-free island off the north coast of Robert Island in the South Shetland Islands, Antarctica
 Tatul, Armenia (Թաթուլ), a village in the Aragatsotn Province of Armenia

People
Tatul
 Tatul Altunyan (1901-1973), Armenian conductor, founder of Armenian State Song-Dance Ensemble (currently named after him), People's Artist of USSR
 Tatul Avoyan (born 1964), known commonly by his mononymn Tatul or Tatoul, an Armenian rabiz singer
 Tatul Hakobyan (born 1969), Armenian reporter and political analyst

Tatoul
 Tatoul Markarian (born 1964), Armenian diplomat

See also 

 Tatl
 Tatle (disambiguation)
 Tattle